Daniele Frignani (born 29 June 1977) is an Italian baseball player who competed in the 2004 Summer Olympics.

References

1977 births
Living people
Olympic baseball players of Italy
Baseball players at the 2004 Summer Olympics
Fortitudo Baseball Bologna players
Baseball managers
Sportspeople from Bologna